Nite Versions is a remix album by Soulwax, released on 26 September 2005 through PIAS. The album comprises remixes of songs from their third studio album, Any Minute Now.

History
The album opens with Soulwax's own take on Daft Punk's 1997 song "Teachers".

A hidden track is present before the start of track 1. The 51-second instrumental is untitled, but is an alternate version of the guitar riff from the original version of E Talking. The artwork for singles from the album form illusions. The album artwork was produced by Trevor Jackson.

In 2012, Nite Versions was awarded a double silver certification from the Independent Music Companies Association, which indicated sales of at least 40,000 copies throughout Europe. "Another Excuse" and "Compute" are featured in Test Drive Unlimited.

Track listing

Notes

References 

2005 albums
Soulwax albums
PIAS Recordings albums